The Lexington and Main Historic District in Wilmore, Kentucky is a  historic district which was listed on the National Register of Historic Places in 1994.

It includes 100, 101, 102, 103, and 105 N. Lexington Ave. and 101 E. Main St. in Wilmore.

It includes five or six contributing buildings.

References

Historic districts on the National Register of Historic Places in Kentucky
Late 19th and Early 20th Century American Movements architecture
National Register of Historic Places in Jessamine County, Kentucky